Os Famosos e os Duendes da Morte (The Famous and The Dead) is a 2009 Brazilian drama film directed by Esmir Filho. This film won best picture award at Festival do Rio 2009.

Cast
Henrique Larré
Ismael Caneppele as Julian
Tuane Eggers

References

External links

2009 drama films
Brazilian drama films
2009 directorial debut films
2009 films
French drama films
2000s Portuguese-language films
2000s French films